Maldives grants free tourist visa or visa-on-arrival status to all nations of the world for 30 days.

Nationals of China and Kazakhstan can enter Maldives for 30 days without visa. Nationals of India and Russia can enter Maldives for 90 days without visa.

Entry requirements
All visitors to Maldives must:

 hold a passport or a travel document with Machine Readable Zone (MRZ) with at least 1 months validity. (Passengers with an extended validity in their passports are not allowed to enter.)
 have a complete travel itinerary including return journey confirmed tickets, with a prepaid confirmed hotel booking at a registered hotel, or provide proof of financial means for sufficient funds to support the stay in Maldives, or hold a pre-approved visa sponsorship Maldives Immigration.
 have entry requirements to their onward destination; for example, the visa and passport validity.
 have Traveller Declaration filled in and submitted by all travelers travelling to and from Maldives, within 96 hours to the flight time. The form has to be submitted electronically via IMUGA.
 have Yellow Fever Vaccination Certificate, if applicable. Children under 1 year of age are exempt from Yellow Fever vaccination. Click here to check the Yellow Fever endemic countries.

Statistics
Most visitors arriving to the Maldives were from the following countries of nationality:

See also

Visa requirements for Maldivian citizens

References

External links 
 Maldives Immigration

Maldives